Skærbæk may refer to:

Skærbæk, Tønder Municipality, a town in Southern Denmark
Skærbæk Municipality, a former municipality
Skærbæk, Fredericia Municipality, a town in Southern Denmark